Dedric Lawson (born October 1, 1997) is an American professional basketball player who last played for the Beşiktaş Icrypex of the Basketbol Süper Ligi (BSL). He played college basketball for the Memphis Tigers and the Kansas Jayhawks.

High school career
Lawson played at Hamilton High School in Memphis, Tennessee alongside his older brother K. J. Lawson. Lawson, a consensus top 30 recruit, reclassified from the class of 2016 to the class of 2015 so he could join K.J. at Memphis. Dedric was selected to the 2015 McDonald's All-American Boys Game. He also has two younger brothers, Chandler and Jonathan, who both play collegiate basketball for Memphis.

College career
As a freshman at Memphis, Dedric averaged 15.8 points and 9.3 rebounds per game and tied Keith Lee’s Memphis record for double-doubles by a freshman. Lawson was named AAC Rookie of the Year as well as the Second Team All-AAC as a freshman. As a sophomore, Lawson was named to the First Team All-AAC. He averaged 19.2 points, 9.9 rebounds and 3.3 assists per game. In April 2017 he announced he was transferring to Kansas alongside K.J. and sat out a year as a redshirt per NCAA policy. In late July he was suspended by Kansas coach Bill Self after being involved in an altercation and did not participate in the team's exhibition trip to Italy.

During his lone season with Kansas, Lawson led the Big 12 in both scoring (19.4 ppg) and rebounding (10.3 rpg). Following Kansas' loss in the 2019 NCAA men's basketball tournament, Lawson announced his intention to forgo his final season of collegiate eligibility and declare for the 2019 NBA draft.

Professional career

Austin Spurs (2019–2020)
After going undrafted in the 2019 NBA draft, Lawson was named in the Golden State Warriors roster for the 2019 NBA Summer League. He joined the San Antonio Spurs for training camp and ultimately was assigned to the Spurs’ NBA G League affiliate, the Austin Spurs. On March 9, 2020, Lawson posted 33 points and 10 rebounds for his 10th double-double of the season during a 117-114 win against the Oklahoma City Blue.

Goyang Orion Orions (2020–2021)
On July 9, 2020, the Goyang Orion Orions added Lawson to their roster.

Beşiktaş (2021–2022)
On June 2, 2021, he has signed with Beşiktaş Icrypex of the Turkish Super League.

He played for the Boston Celtics in the 2021 NBA summer league, missing a single three point shot in his 4-minute debut, a 85-83 win against the Atlanta Hawks in which he started.

College statistics

College

|-
| style="text-align:left;"| 2015–16
| style="text-align:left;"| Memphis
| 33 || 32 || 32.2 || .409 || .350 || .709 || 9.3 || 2.5 || 1.2 || 1.7 || 15.8
|-
| style="text-align:left;"| 2016–17
| style="text-align:left;"| Memphis
| 32 || 32 || 34.5 || .461 || .270 || .741 || 9.9 || 3.3 || 1.3 || 2.1 || 19.2
|-
| style="text-align:left;"| 2018–19
| style="text-align:left;"| Kansas
| 36 || 36 || 32.6 || .490 || .393 || .815 || 10.3 || 1.7 || 1.3 || 1.1 || 19.4
|- class="sortbottom"
| style="text-align:center;" colspan="2"| Career
| 101 || 100 || 33.1 || .455 || .332 || .757 || 9.9 || 2.5 || 1.2 || 1.6 || 18.2

References

External links
Kansas Jayhawks bio
NBA Draft profile

1997 births
Living people
All-American college men's basketball players
American expatriate basketball people in South Korea
American men's basketball players
Austin Spurs players
Basketball players from Memphis, Tennessee
Beşiktaş men's basketball players
Goyang Carrot Jumpers players
Kansas Jayhawks men's basketball players
McDonald's High School All-Americans
Memphis Tigers men's basketball players
Parade High School All-Americans (boys' basketball)
Power forwards (basketball)